Robert André Edouard Baldick, FRSL (9 November 1927 – April 1972), was a British scholar of French literature, writer, translator and joint editor of the Penguin Classics series with Betty Radice. He was a Fellow of Pembroke College, Oxford.

He wrote eight books including biographies of Joris-Karl Huysmans, Frédérick Lemaître and Henry Murger and a history of the Siege of Paris. In addition he edited and translated The Goncourt Journals and other classics of French literature including works by Gustave Flaubert, Chateaubriand, Jean-Paul Sartre, Jules Verne, and Henri Barbusse, as well as a number of novels by Georges Simenon.

His sons are Julian Baldick, an author specialising in Sufism, and English academic Chris Baldick.

Bibliography 
 The Life of Joris Karl Huysmans. (Published originally by Oxford University Press, 1955. New edition revised by Brendan King, Dedalus Books 2006)
 Dinner at Magny's (Published by Victor Gollancz, London) 
 The Life and Times of Frédérick Lemaître (Published by Hamish Hamilton)
 The Goncourts (Published by Bowes and Bowes)
 The First Bohemian: The Life of Henry Murger (Published by Hamish Hamilton)
 The Siege of Paris (Published by Batsford)
 The Duel: A History of Duelling (Published by Chapman and Hall)
 The Memoirs of Chateaubriand  (Edited, translated and published by Hamish Hamilton)
 Pages from the Goncourt Journal (Edited and translated by Oxford University Press)
 Memoirs (Chateaubriand - Translator from French to English)
 Nausea (Sartre - Translator from French to English)
 Pages from The Goncourt Journal (Translator from French to English)
 Sentimental Education (Flaubert - Translator from French to English)
 Three Tales (Flaubert - Translator from French to English)
 Against Nature (Huysmans - Translator from French to English)
 Hell (Barbusse - Translator from French to English)
 Aphrodite (1972) from Aphrodite: mœurs antiques by Pierre Louÿs (Translator from French to English)

See also
Translated Penguin Book - at  Penguin First Editions reference site of early first edition Penguin Books.

Footnotes 

1927 births
1972 deaths
English translators
Fellows of Pembroke College, Oxford
Jules Verne
20th-century British translators
20th-century French novelists
20th-century male writers
Fellows of the Royal Society of Literature
Penguin Books people
British speculative fiction translators